
Gmina Zagórów is an urban-rural gmina (administrative district) in Słupca County, Greater Poland Voivodeship, in west-central Poland.

The gmina contains part of the protected area called Warta Landscape Park.

Villages
Apart from the town of Zagórów, Gmina Zagórów contains the villages and settlements of Adamierz, Anielewo, Augustynów, Bukowe, Chruściki, Długa Górka, Drzewce, Grabina, Grądzeń, Huta Łukomska, Imielno, Kirchol, Kopojno, Kopojno-Parcele, Kościołków, Koszelewska Łąka, Łazińsk Drugi, Łazińsk Pierwszy, Łazy, Łomów, Łukom, Mariantów, Michalinów near Oleśnica, Michalinów near Trąbczyn, Myszaków, Myszakówek, Nowa Wieś, Olchowo, Oleśnica, Oleśnica-Folwark, Osiny, Podbiel, Przybysław, Skokum, Smoleniec, Stanisławów, Stawisko, Szetlew, Szetlewek, Tarszewo, Trąbczyn, Trąbczyn B, Trąbczyn D, Trąbczyn Dworski, Wincentowo, Włodzimirów, Wrąbczyn, Wrąbczyn Górski, Wymysłów and Zalesie.

Neighbouring gminas
Gmina Zagórów is bordered by the gminas of Gizałki, Grodziec, Lądek, Pyzdry and Rzgów.

References
Polish official population figures 2006

Zagorow
Słupca County